MG-010 is a state highway in Minas Gerais, Brazil. Its total length is 307.9 kilometers. Its route starts in Belo Horizonte and ends in the municipality of Rio Vermelho. Since the construction of the Belo Horizonte International Airport, in the municipality of Confins, MG-010 has been a road of vital importance for the entire state of Minas Gerais. In mid-2005, the government launched the  project, which consists of creating a modern corridor for Confins airport. Since then the MG-010 has undergone several modifications.

Route 
The highway connects the following municipalities:

 Belo Horizonte
 Vespasiano
 Lagoa Santa
 Jaboticatubas
 Santana do Riacho (in the district of Cardeal Mota)
 Conceição do Mato Dentro
 Serro
 Santo Antônio do Itambé
 Serra Azul de Minas
 Rio Vermelho

References 

Highways in Minas Gerais